Eburia brevispinis is a species of beetle in the family Cerambycidae, that can be found in Guatemala, Mexico and Nicaragua.

References

brevispinis
Beetles described in 1880